Jennifer Capriati was the defending champion, but lost in the second round to Rita Kuti-Kis.

Silvija Talaja won the title by defeating Kuti-Kis 7–5, 4–6, 6–3 in the final.

Seeds
The first two seeds received a bye into the second round.

Draw

Finals

Top half

Bottom half

References

External links
 Official results archive (ITF)
 Official results archive (WTA)

Internationaux de Strasbourgandnbsp;- Singles
2000 Singles
Internationaux de Strasbourg